Werther Thiers Charles da Silva, also known as Charles (born 11 March 1984) is a Brazilian football midfielder who plays for Club Aurora.

References

 
1984 births
Living people
Footballers from São Paulo
Brazilian footballers
Esporte Clube São Bento players
2 de Mayo footballers
Sportivo Trinidense footballers
Sportivo Luqueño players
Club Bolívar players
Al-Raed FC players
Esporte Clube Pelotas players
Guaratinguetá Futebol players
Club Aurora players
Nacional Potosí players
Ermis Aradippou FC players
Club San José players
Bolivian Primera División players
Cypriot First Division players
Saudi Professional League players
Association football midfielders
Brazilian expatriate footballers
Expatriate footballers in Paraguay
Brazilian expatriate sportspeople in Paraguay
Expatriate footballers in Bolivia
Brazilian expatriate sportspeople in Bolivia
Expatriate footballers in Saudi Arabia
Brazilian expatriate sportspeople in Saudi Arabia
Expatriate footballers in Cyprus
Brazilian expatriate sportspeople in Cyprus
Club Aurora managers